Comet Records was an American jazz and R&B record label, founded in 1944 by Les Schriber, Sr. and Harry Alderton.  The label is most known for having recorded and produced T-Bone Walker and Red Norvo.  The label was acquired by Black & White Records and operated as a subsidiary.  Comet recorded – but never released – a session with Charlie Parker on June 6, 1945.  That master was sold to Dial Records in 1949, when Black & White Records went out of business.

Selected session discography 
Red Norvo and His Selected Sextet recorded June 6, 1945, at WOR Recording Studios, 1440 Broadway, New York.  The master was originally owned by Comet, but sold to Dial Records who first released some of the cuts.  The musicians were Dizzy Gillespie, Charlie Parker, Flip Phillips, Red Norvo, Teddy Wilson, Slam Stewart, Specs Powell, and J.C. Heard.  Heard alternated with Powell.

 Various reissues (compilations)
 ; .

 Various takes

References
 Comet T6 (1945); 
 Comet T7 (1945); 
 Dial 1045 (1949); 
 Dial LP903;

Comet artists & their original shellac (78rpm) releases 
 Cow Cow Davenport
 C-1 "Gotta Girl For Every Day In The Week" / "Jump, Little Jitterbug" (1944)
 C-2 "Jeep Boogie" / "Chimin' Away" (1944)
 C-3 "Hobson City Stomp" / "Run Into Me" (1944)
 C-4 "Cow Cow's Stomp" / "Gin Mill Stomp" (1944)

 Art Tatum Trio (featuring Tiny Grimes and Slam Stewart)
 T-1 "The Man I Love" / "Dark Eyes" (1944); 
 T-2 "Body and Soul" / "I Know That You Know" (1944); 
 T-3 "On The Sunny Side of the Street" / "Flying Home" (1944); 

 Cyril Haynes (de) Sextet (featuring Don Byas) (Cyril Nathaniel Haynes; 1915–1996) 
 T-4 "Morning Madness" / "One Sad Thursday" (1945); 
 T-5 "Across The Road" / "Cedar Manor" (1945)

 Red Norvo & His Selected Sextet (featuring Charlie Parker)
 T-6 "Halleluliah" [sic] / "Slam Slam Blues" (1945); 
 Reissued by Dial (1949); 
 T-7 "Get Happy" / "Congo Blues" (1945); 
 Reissued by Dial (1949); 

 Four Kings & A Queen / Orval "Baggie" Hardiman (1913–1999)
 1301 "All I Need Is A Lucky Break" / "Shoo Shoo Baby" (1944) 
 1302 "King's Boogie" / "Lost My Sugar In Salt Lake City" (1944)
 1304 "One Of Those Dreams That Fell Thru" / "Ration Blues" (1945)

 T-Bone Walker & His Guitar (unissued Black & White masters except the previously issued "T-Bone Shuffle")
 T-50 "West Side Baby" / "Lonesome Woman Blues" (issued 1948); 
 T-51 "I'm Still In Love With You" / "Inspiration Blues" (issued 1948); 
 T-52 "That Old Feelin' Is Gone" / "Description Blues" (issued 1948); 
 T-53 "First Love Blues" / "T-Bone Shuffle" (issued 1949); 

Jack McVea & His All Stars
 T-100 "B.B. Boogie" / "H.P. Boogie" (1948)
 Previously issued by Black & White as "Bartender Boogie" (1945); 
 Previously issued by Black & White as "House Party Boogie" (1946);

References
 Notes

 Inline citations

Record labels established in 1944
Blues record labels
Defunct record labels of the United States
Jazz record labels